Geert De Vlieger (born 16 October 1971) is a Belgian former professional footballer who played as a goalkeeper.

Career
De Vlieger was born  in Dendermonde. He started his career in his home country playing for Anderlecht and Beveren before moving to the Netherlands and playing for Willem II for four years between 2000 and 2004. He played his first international for Belgium in 1999 and won 43 caps for his country. He was the second choice goalkeeper for the UEFA Euro 2000 behind starter Filip De Wilde, but then became the number 1 starter for the 2002 FIFA World Cup replacing the latter after De Wilde's poor performances during the Euro 2000.

De Vlieger signed with Manchester City in June 2004, but due to an achilles tendon injury he sustained, he missed the entirety of the 2004–05 season and did not play a single game during his two seasons in England. In June 2006, he signed for Zulte Waregem to make a comeback in the Belgian First Division A. On 30 May 2008, De Vlieger signed a one-year contract with Club Brugge as the backup behind Stijn Stijnen, as former backup Glenn Verbauwhede had been loaned out to Kortrijk. He announced his retirement from football in February 2011 at age 39.

Honours 
Beveren
 Second Division: 1990–91

Anderlecht
 Belgian Cup runner-up: 1996–97

Belgium
 FIFA Fair Play Trophy: 2002 World Cup

Individual
 Best Belgian Footballer Abroad: 2001

References

External links
 

Living people
1971 births
Association football goalkeepers
Belgian footballers
Belgium international footballers
Flemish sportspeople
Belgian Pro League players
Challenger Pro League players
Eredivisie players
K.S.K. Beveren players
R.S.C. Anderlecht players
K.R.C. Zuid-West-Vlaanderen players
Willem II (football club) players
Manchester City F.C. players
S.V. Zulte Waregem players
Club Brugge KV players
UEFA Euro 2000 players
2002 FIFA World Cup players
Belgian expatriate footballers
Expatriate footballers in the Netherlands
Belgian expatriate sportspeople in the Netherlands
Expatriate footballers in England
Belgian expatriate sportspeople in England